Polemidia may refer to:

 Kato Polemidia, a northwestern suburb of Limassol, Cyprus
 Pano Polemidia, a village north of Kato Polemidia